Flight 73 may refer to:
Pan Am Flight 73, hijacked on 5 September 1986
Air Niugini Flight 73, crashed on 28 September 2018

0073